Moscow City Duma District 21 is one of 45 constituencies in Moscow City Duma. The constituency has covered parts of South-Eastern Moscow since 2014. From 1993-2005 District 21 was based in Southern Moscow; however, after the number of constituencies was reduced to 15 in 2005, the constituency was eliminated.

Members elected

Election results

2001

|-
! colspan=2 style="background-color:#E9E9E9;text-align:left;vertical-align:top;" |Candidate
! style="background-color:#E9E9E9;text-align:left;vertical-align:top;" |Party
! style="background-color:#E9E9E9;text-align:right;" |Votes
! style="background-color:#E9E9E9;text-align:right;" |%
|-
|style="background-color:"|
|align=left|Stepan Orlov (incumbent)
|align=left|Independent
|
|53.14%
|-
|style="background-color:"|
|align=left|Mikhail Virin
|align=left|Independent
|
|10.50%
|-
|style="background-color:"|
|align=left|Vladimir Yemelyanov
|align=left|Independent
|
|8.12%
|-
|style="background-color:"|
|align=left|Svetlana Nosova
|align=left|Independent
|
|8.08%
|-
|style="background-color:"|
|align=left|Vladimir Mashkin
|align=left|Independent
|
|4.64%
|-
|style="background-color:"|
|align=left|Konstantin Morozov
|align=left|Independent
|
|2.01%
|-
|style="background-color:#000000"|
|colspan=2 |against all
|
|11.57%
|-
| colspan="5" style="background-color:#E9E9E9;"|
|- style="font-weight:bold"
| colspan="3" style="text-align:left;" | Total
| 
| 100%
|-
| colspan="5" style="background-color:#E9E9E9;"|
|- style="font-weight:bold"
| colspan="4" |Source:
|
|}

2014

|-
! colspan=2 style="background-color:#E9E9E9;text-align:left;vertical-align:top;" |Candidate
! style="background-color:#E9E9E9;text-align:left;vertical-align:top;" |Party
! style="background-color:#E9E9E9;text-align:right;" |Votes
! style="background-color:#E9E9E9;text-align:right;" |%
|-
|style="background-color:"|
|align=left|Andrey Klychkov
|align=left|Communist Party
|
|37.32%
|-
|style="background-color:"|
|align=left|Vladimir Zotov
|align=left|United Russia
|
|32.16%
|-
|style="background-color:"|
|align=left|Valery Katkov
|align=left|A Just Russia
|
|13.50%
|-
|style="background-color:"|
|align=left|Svetlana Rodionova
|align=left|Yabloko
|
|8.11%
|-
|style="background-color:"|
|align=left|Aleksey Balabutkin
|align=left|Independent
|
|3.91%
|-
|style="background-color:"|
|align=left|Artyom Lipagin
|align=left|Liberal Democratic Party
|
|2.29%
|-
| colspan="5" style="background-color:#E9E9E9;"|
|- style="font-weight:bold"
| colspan="3" style="text-align:left;" | Total
| 
| 100%
|-
| colspan="5" style="background-color:#E9E9E9;"|
|- style="font-weight:bold"
| colspan="4" |Source:
|
|}

2019

|-
! colspan=2 style="background-color:#E9E9E9;text-align:left;vertical-align:top;" |Candidate
! style="background-color:#E9E9E9;text-align:left;vertical-align:top;" |Party
! style="background-color:#E9E9E9;text-align:right;" |Votes
! style="background-color:#E9E9E9;text-align:right;" |%
|-
|style="background-color:"|
|align=left|Leonid Zyuganov
|align=left|Communist Party
|
|57.40%
|-
|style="background-color:"|
|align=left|Vera Shevchenko
|align=left|Independent
|
|17.86%
|-
|style="background-color:"|
|align=left|Yekaterina Borodina
|align=left|A Just Russia
|
|10.57%
|-
|style="background-color:"|
|align=left|Andrey Shakh
|align=left|Liberal Democratic Party
|
|9.22%
|-
| colspan="5" style="background-color:#E9E9E9;"|
|- style="font-weight:bold"
| colspan="3" style="text-align:left;" | Total
| 
| 100%
|-
| colspan="5" style="background-color:#E9E9E9;"|
|- style="font-weight:bold"
| colspan="4" |Source:
|
|}

Notes

References

Moscow City Duma districts